Johns Branch may refer to:

Johns Branch (Sandy Creek), a stream in Missouri
Johns Branch (West Fork Cuivre River), a stream in Missouri